Evan Lee Scribner (born July 19, 1985) is an American former professional baseball pitcher. He played in Major League Baseball (MLB) for the San Diego Padres, Oakland Athletics, and Seattle Mariners.

Professional career

Arizona Diamondbacks
Scribner  was selected by the Arizona Diamondbacks in the 28th round (853rd overall) of the 2007 Major League Baseball Draft from Central Connecticut State University where he set the school's record for both career wins (23) and saves (14).

San Diego Padres
In 2008, the Diamondbacks traded Scribner to the San Diego Padres in return for Tony Clark. Following the 2010 season, he was added to the Padres' 40 man roster to protect him from the Rule 5 draft.

On April 25, 2011, Scribner was called up to replace spot-starter Wade LeBlanc. He made his MLB debut the next day.

Oakland Athletics
After the season, on October 25, 2011, he was claimed off waivers by the Oakland Athletics. Both of his wins on the season came in the last 9 games of the season. He received the win in the last game of the season against the Texas Rangers, this gave the Oakland A's the AL West division crown.

Scribner made the A's Opening day roster for the 2013 season, beating out Pedro Figueroa and non-roster relievers Hideki Okajima and Mike Ekstrom. Scribner was recalled on August 3, 2013 in exchange for Tommy Milone. He was recalled from the Triple-A Sacramento River Cats on August 28.

Scribner made the A's Opening day roster again in 2015, having developed a new pitch, he soon emerged as the setup man for Oakland with Tyler Clippard moving to the closer role as a result of 2014 closer Sean Doolittle being placed on the Disabled List with a Shoulder injury in early April. Scribner's season ended prematurely due to a torn lat muscle, he was placed on the 60-day disabled list on September 2, 2015.

Seattle Mariners
On December 8, 2015, Scribner was traded by the Athletics to the Seattle Mariners in exchange for minor league pitcher Trey Cochran-Gill. Scribner spent almost the entire 2016 season on the Disabled list but was activated on September 1 and made his Mariners debut on September 3 against the Los Angeles Angels. Scribner was placed on waivers for his unconditional release from the Mariners on September 5, 2017.

Tampa Bay Rays
On February 6, 2018, Scribner signed a minor league contract with the Tampa Bay Rays. Scribner was released by the Rays on March 7.

New Britain Bees
On May 15, 2018, Scribner signed with the New Britain Bees of the Atlantic League of Professional Baseball. He became a free agent following the 2018 season.

Awards and honors
2004 Northeast Conference Tournament Most Valuable Player 
2008 Midwest League Mid-Season All-Star
2009 Texas League All-Star

Personal life
His brother, Troy Scribner, is a pitcher who last played in Major League Baseball for the Arizona Diamondbacks.

References

External links

1985 births
Living people
San Diego Padres players
Oakland Athletics players
Seattle Mariners players
Central Connecticut Blue Devils baseball players
South Bend Silver Hawks players
Missoula Osprey players
Lake Elsinore Storm players
Visalia Oaks players
San Antonio Missions players
Tucson Padres players
Sacramento River Cats players
Bakersfield Blaze players
Arizona League Mariners players
Jackson Generals (Southern League) players
Tacoma Rainiers players
Baseball players from Connecticut
Peoria Saguaros players
New Britain Bees players
Major League Baseball pitchers